DeGray Lake Resort State Park is a  Arkansas state park in Clark and Hot Spring counties, Arkansas in the United States. Situated in the Ouachita Mountains, the park features the  DeGray Lake, the park features a championship rated 18 hole golf course and Arkansas's only state park resort. The United States Army Corps of Engineers began constructing DeGray Dam on the Caddo River in 1963, and support for a state park began growing shortly after. The park was created in 1974, and the resort and golf course were added by 1975.

Recreation
DeGray Lake Resort State Park offers many different opportunities for outdoors enthusiasts such as fishing, swimming, water skiing, biking, hiking, horseback riding, and boating. Basketball courts and tennis courts are also available. For campers, there are 113 class A sites in addition to RV sites. The marina offers full range of services as well as boat slips, party barges, flatbottom boats, paddle boats, canoe, paddleboards and kayaks for rent. Picnic tables are scattered throughout the park, with the Caddo Bend Day-Use Area and private pavilion also available.

Resort and golf course

The 94-room DeGray Lodge and Convention center is available for family reunions, retreats, board meeting, conventions and stunning lake front weddings. The Shoreline Restaurant and DeGray Day Spa are located at the lodge.

DeGray's challenging 18-hole championship-rated public course stretches 7,100 yards (6,500 m). The course offers opportunities to view the birds and other wildlife that abound here. The front nine offers wide, expansive fairways with elevated, undulating and sloping greens, tee boxes and hidden water hazards. The back nine are carved out of the woodlands leaving little room for stray shots. The course offers a driving range, practice green, chipping area and lessons, from the blue tees the course is 7,100 yards (6,500 m), from the white-6,560 yards (6,000 m), gold-6,200 yards (5,700 m) and red-5,800 yards (5,300 m). The course rating is 72.7 and the slope is 134. Water comes into play on seven holes. The Pro Shop offers a snack bar, cart and club rentals, golf equipment and a wide selection of brand name golf apparel and accessories for purchase.

See also

Beavers Bend Resort Park, similar park across the Oklahoma border

References

External links

Lakes of the U.S. Interior Highlands
State parks of Arkansas
Ouachita Mountains
Protected areas of Clark County, Arkansas
Protected areas of Hot Spring County, Arkansas
Protected areas established in 1974
Golf clubs and courses in Arkansas